Chloroparvula is a genus of green algae in the class Chloropicophyceae.

Description
Members of this genus are distinguished from other species of Chloropicophyceae by having a thick and smooth wall, sometimes with fibrils, and a string-like ornamentation.

Taxonomy
The name Chloroparvula references both its green color (chloro-) and its small size (-parvula).
There are two species in the genus:
 Chloroparvula pacifica Lopes dos Santos & Eikrem 2017 (type species)
 Chloroparvula japonica Lopes dos Santos & Eikrem 2017

References

Chlorophyta
Green algae genera